Peirae or Peirai was a village of ancient Achaea in the neighbourhood of Olenus, and one of the places to which the inhabitants of Olenus fled upon leaving their city.

References

Populated places in ancient Achaea
Former populated places in Greece
Lost ancient cities and towns